Patrick Eugene Donovan (born May 8, 1964) is an American lawyer and an associate justice of the New Hampshire Supreme Court.

Education
He graduated from Salem High School in Salem, New Hampshire.

Donovan received his Bachelor of Arts from Dartmouth College in 1986. He received his Juris Doctor from Boston College Law School in 1990, where he served as Articles Editor for the Boston College Environmental Law Review.

Legal career

After graduating law school, Donovan clerked for New Hampshire Supreme Court Justice W. Stephen Thayer III. He went on to spend three years as an associate with Goodwin Procter in Boston, where he focused on environmental litigation, before accepting an appointment to the New Hampshire Department of Justice in 1994. Donovan served as an Assistant and Senior Assistant Attorney General for six years, litigating complex civil matters, homicide cases and state and federal court appeals.  In 2000, he returned to private practice and opened his own firm in Salem, New Hampshire.  While in private practice, Donovan served as Legal Counsel to the New Hampshire House of Representatives in the office of speaker Doug Scamman.  In 2008, he became a sole practitioner at his law firm Patrick E. Donovan, PLLC.

Service on New Hampshire Supreme Court

On March 21, 2018, Governor Chris Sununu nominated Donovan to serve on the New Hampshire Supreme Court. He was unanimously confirmed by the Executive Council. He was sworn into office on May 8, 2018.

Personal life

Patrick was born in Baltimore, Maryland, then moved to Salem, New Hampshire, at age 12. He and his wife, Attorney Monique Donovan (formerly Deragon) have four children.

References

1964 births
Living people
21st-century American judges
21st-century American lawyers
Boston College Law School alumni
Dartmouth College alumni
Lawyers from Baltimore
20th-century American lawyers
New Hampshire lawyers
Justices of the New Hampshire Supreme Court